Nylanderia yerburyi, is a species of Formicinae ant found in India, Nicobar Islands, Sri Lanka, and China.

External links

 at antwiki.org

Formicinae
Hymenoptera of Asia
Insects described in 1894